Nerses Bakur was the Catholicos and head of Caucasian Albanian Church in the late 7th and early 8th century.

Election 
Attested in The History of the Country of Albania, he was mentioned as a bishop of Gardman during the tenure of his predecessor Eghiazar. Reportedly he was elected after the influence and intervention of Queen Spram, wife of Varaz-Tiridates I.

Tenure 
A long proponent of Chalcedonian Christianity, the clique wanted to achieve political and religious independence of Albania through alliance with Byzantine Empire. However, he didn't proclaim it openly until 702. As part of reforms, he appointed his Chalcedonian ally Zakʿaria as bishop of Greater Arran bishopric, succeeding previous Miaphysite bishop Yovēl. He also dismissed Israel (now bishop of Greater Kolmank) and Eghiazar – bishop of Gardman, Nerses' former seat. Rival clique was led by Sheroy – regent of Albania, as well as Yovhannēs (bishop of Qabala), Sahak (bishop of Amaras).

Deposition 
Nerses' reforms in church alarmed Elias I (703–717), the Armenian Catholicos to intervene and apply to Caliph Abd-al-Malik. Elias accused Nerses and Spram of swearing alliance to Byzantines and plotting against the Umayyad Caliphate.Nerses and Spram were caught by Sheroy exiled to Damascus where he died. His books were pillaged from his summer residence in Berdakor and was thrown into Tartar river.He was succeeded by Simeon who was installed by Elias. After Nerses' death, Caucasian Albanian Church became a subject of Armenian Apostolic Church.

References

Sources 

 

704 deaths
8th-century Asian people
Church of Caucasian Albania